Saint Gaudentius of Rimini (Also known as Saint Gaudentius of Ephesus; Italian: San Gaudenzio di Rimini; –October 14, 360) was born in Ephesus in Asia Minor. In 308 he migrated to Rome and was baptized. In 332 he was ordained as a priest and fourteen years later consecrated as a bishop. He was then sent to Ariminum (modern Rimini, Italy) where he became the first bishop of that city. In 359, he attended the Council of Rimini called by the Roman Emperor Constantius II, specially convened to condemn Arius. After attacking the beliefs of Arianism, he was arrested by the emperor's representative and then kidnapped from the authorities and lynched by the followers of Arius. He is honored as a martyr by the Catholic Church.

References

External links
 San Gaudenzio

Bishops of Rimini
Saints from Roman Italy
4th-century Italian bishops
4th-century births
360 deaths
4th-century Christian saints
Lynching deaths